Melvin Zaalman (born 17 June 1988 in Rotterdam, Netherlands) is a Dutch footballer who made his Eerste Divisie league debut for club FC Dordrecht during the 2009–2010 season.

References

External links
voetbal international profile

Dutch footballers
Footballers from Rotterdam
Dutch sportspeople of Surinamese descent
FC Dordrecht players
Eerste Divisie players
Netherlands youth international footballers
1988 births
Living people
Association football midfielders